The Cast Iron Commercial Building is an historic building in Los Angeles, California, United States. Built in 1903, the brick structure exhibits Queen Anne architecture with Italianate details. The Cast Iron Commercial Building has been designated a Los Angeles Historic-Cultural Monument.

See also
 List of Los Angeles Historic-Cultural Monuments in Downtown Los Angeles

References

Buildings and structures in Los Angeles
Los Angeles Historic-Cultural Monuments